The 1994 Winton ATCC round was the sixth round of the 1994 Australian Touring Car Championship. It was held on the weekend of 13 to 15 May at Winton Motor Raceway in Benalla, Victoria.

Race results

Qualifying 
Glenn Seton took pole position, crushing the field by nearly half a second.

Race 1 
In what was a dominant performance, Glenn Seton took a flag-to-flag victory with team-mate Alan Jones in second position. Wayne Gardner was sent down the pack after being spun out by Larry Perkins, losing his front spoiler in the process.

Race 2 
For race two, Jones got off to a flyer and shot off to an early lead. However, a few laps later, he would spin out, handing the lead to team-mate, Glenn Seton. Jones would charge back through the field to achieve third, whilst Seton would take the win. Mark Skaife rounded out a clean race with a valiant second placing.

Championship Standings 

Drivers' Championship standings

References

External links 

Winton